Su Hua (Chinese: 宿一华, born 1982 in Hunan Province) is a  Chinese billionaire internet entrepreneur. He is the co-founder and CEO of the video platform Kuaishou, which is known outside of China under the name Kwai. In April 2021, Forbes estimated his personal wealth at $17 billion.

Early life 
Su comes from a simple family from a village in the west of Hunan Province, which only received electricity in 1998. He learned to code on a children's learning program age 12. He is a graduate of Tsinghua University.

Career 
He worked as a software developer first for Google in the United States and later for Baidu. In 2011, together with Cheng Yixiao, he founded the mobile app Kuaishou, which was initially intended for sharing GIF images. Kuaishou later became an app for short videos and live streaming. Tencent was one of the early investors.

References 

1982 births
Living people
21st-century Chinese businesspeople
Baidu people
Chinese billionaires
Chinese computer businesspeople
Chinese software engineers
Chinese technology company founders
Google people
Tsinghua University alumni
Businesspeople from Hunan